The 17th Iowa Infantry Regiment was an infantry regiment that served in the Union Army during the American Civil War.

Service
The 17th Iowa Infantry was organized at Keokuk, Iowa, and mustered in for three years of Federal service on April 16, 1862.

The regiment was mustered out on July 25, 1865.

Total strength and casualties
The 17th Iowa mustered 958 men at the time it left Iowa for active campaigning.
It suffered 5 officers and 66 enlisted men who were killed in action or who died of their wounds and 2 officers and 121 enlisted men who died of disease, for a total of 194 fatalities.

Commanders
Colonel John W. Rankin
Colonel David Burke Hillis

See also
List of Iowa Civil War Units
Iowa in the American Civil War

Notes

References
The Civil War Archive

Units and formations of the Union Army from Iowa
Military units and formations established in 1862
1862 establishments in Iowa
Military units and formations disestablished in 1865